Carl L. Thunberg, FSAScot (born 25 October 1963) is a Swedish historian and archaeologist, with a profile of renewed, extensive studies of classic source materials. As a scholar, Thunberg has worked in several fields in his academic disciplines, but is perhaps best known for his in-depth specialized works on source material regarding the period from the Viking Age to the Nordic Middle Ages. He has also been active in the field of popular history. In addition to his writing, he is known for his commitment to the Swedish cultural heritage, in terms of antiquities and ancient sites, and for his public lectures.

Biography
Thunberg received his advanced education at the University of Gothenburg and Uppsala University. 
Through development work, Thunberg has been committed to issues concerning the situation of didactic method for history as a school subject. He was a lecturer in this field during the research conference Svenska historikermötet ("Swedish Historians' Meeting") in 2017 at Mid Sweden University.
Thunberg became a fellow of the Society of Antiquaries of Scotland in 2016. He participated in the excavations of 2009 in Ytterby which resulted in the finding of what has been interpreted as the precursor to Kungahälla. From 2010 to 2012 he was the driving force in the victorious cultural policy struggle to preserve the archaeological reconstructions at the archaeological site Genesmon (also known as Gene fornby) outside Örnsköldsvik in Sweden. In 2022 Thunberg was appointed chairman of Västernorrland County Museum (Swedish: Länsmuseet Västernorrland).

Selected publications
 Nya kritiska undersökningar i Nordens historia omkring år 1000 (2021) [New critical studies in Nordic history around AD 1000] .
 Fornnordisk historia II (2018) [Ancient Nordic History II] 
 Fornnordisk historia I (2018) [Ancient Nordic History I] 
 ’’Gene fornby: The Ancient Village of Gene’’(2013). In: EXARC Journal Digest 2013. ISSN 2212-523X.
 Slaget på Fyrisvallarna i ny tolkning (2012) [The Battle of Fýrisvellir in a New Interpretation] , .
 Att tolka Svitjod (2012) [To interpret Svitjod] , .
 Särkland och dess källmaterial (2011) [Serkland and its Source Material] , .
 Ingvarståget och dess monument (2010) [The Ingvar Expedition and its Monuments] , .

References

External links

 The Ingvar Runestones on Google Maps (after Thunberg 2010: Ingvarståget och dess monument)

  EXARC Archaeological Open-Air Museum Section 

 Carl L. Thunberg (2011): Särkland och dess källmaterial (Serkland and its Source Material)

 Carl L. Thunberg (2012): Slaget på Fyrisvallarna i ny tolkning (The Battle of Fýrisvellir in a New Interpretation)

 Carl L. Thunberg (2013). "Gene fornby: The Ancient Village of Gene". In: EXARC Journal, 2013/1

  Carl L. Thunberg (2015). ’’Forgotten monuments of Northern Sweden’’, In: Past Horizons, 2015, 22/3

1963 births
Living people
Swedish archaeologists
21st-century Swedish historians
Medievalists
University of Gothenburg alumni
Uppsala University alumni